Berlin High School is or was the name of several high schools:

Canada
 Kitchener–Waterloo Collegiate and Vocational School, which was previously known as the Berlin High School

United States

Berlin High School (Connecticut)
Berlin High School (New Hampshire)
Berlin High School (Wisconsin)
Old Berlin High School, former high school in Wisconsin, listed on the National Register of Historic Places